Nonahydroxytriphenic acid is a moiety found in some ellagitannins such as roburin A, B,C and D, castalagin or grandinin.

References 

Ellagitannins
Tricarboxylic acids